FIAT-Revelli machine gun
can refer to:

Fiat-Revelli Modello 1914
Fiat-Revelli Modello 1935